Herbal tobacco may refer to:

 Herbal cigarettes
 Herbal smokeless tobacco